The Death Dance is a 1918 American film directed by J. Searle Dawley with Alice Brady as Flora Farnsworth, Holmes Herbert as Arnold Maitland, Mahlon Hamilton as Philip Standish.

References

1918 films
American silent films
American black-and-white films
Silent American drama films
1918 drama films
Selznick Pictures films
Films directed by J. Searle Dawley
1910s American films